Starfleet or Star Fleet (implying a fleet of spacecraft operating in interstellar space) can refer to:

 Starfleet, the paramilitary defense, research, diplomacy, and exploration force in the Star Trek franchise
 Starfleet International, a Star Trek fan club
 Star Fleet Battles, a Star Trek strategy board war game
 X-Bomber, a Japanese science fiction puppet show, the English-dubbed version of which is named Star Fleet
 "Star Fleet", the theme tune to the English-dubbed version of X-Bomber, written and performed by Paul Bliss and covered by Brian May
 Star Fleet (game series), a series of computer games unrelated to the Star Trek franchise. Existed since the late 1970s
 The Imperial Navy (Star Wars) in Star Wars, which is at times referred to as the "Imperial Starfleet"
 The Galactic Republic's Judicial Starfleet in Star Wars
 The Star Fleet, a fleet of tugboats in the British animation series TUGS
 Star Fleet Project, a one-off 1983 music project organized by Brian May
 "Star Fleet", the title track
 Starfleet Wars, a space battle game by Superior Models, featuring five races: Terrans, Entomalians, Avarians, Aquarians, and Carnivorans

Ships
 The Star Fleet, owned by the Alaska Packers' Association, was the last fleet of commercial sailing vessels on the West Coast.
 The "Star Fleet" of the Star Line, Ltd. shipping company consisted of seven ships, some of which were sold to the Alaska Packers' Association.

See also
 Aeroflot, meaning "Air Fleet" in Russian. The flag carrier and largest airline of the Russian Federation (the USSR's successor state).